Marine spatial planning (MSP) is a process that brings together multiple users of the ocean – including energy, industry, government, conservation and recreation – to make informed and coordinated decisions about how to use marine resources sustainably. MSP generally uses maps to create a more comprehensive picture of a marine area – identifying where and how an ocean area is being used and what natural resources and habitat exist. It is similar to land-use planning, but for marine waters.

Through the planning and mapping process of a marine ecosystem, planners can consider the cumulative effect of maritime industries on our seas, seek to make industries more sustainable and proactively minimize conflicts between industries seeking to utilise the same sea area. The intended result of MSP is a more coordinated and sustainable approach to how our oceans are used – ensuring that marine resources and services are utilized, but within clear environmental limits to ensure marine ecosystems remain healthy and biodiversity is conserved.

Definition and concept
The most commonly used definition of marine spatial planning was developed by the Intergovernmental Oceanographic Commission (IOC) of UNESCO: 

The main elements of marine spatial planning include an interlinked system of plans, policies and regulations; the components of environmental management systems (e.g. setting objectives, initial assessment, implementation, monitoring, audit and review); and some of the many tools that are already used for land use planning. Whatever the building blocks, the essential consideration is that they need to work across sectors and give a geographic context in which to make decisions about the use of resources, development, conservation and the management of activities in the marine environment

Effective marine spatial planning has essential attributes:

 Multi-objective. Marine spatial planning should balance ecological, social, economic, and governance objectives, but the over riding objective should be increased sustainability. 
 Spatially focused. The ocean area to be managed must be clearly defined, ideally at the ecosystem level - certainly being large enough to incorporate relevant ecosystem processes.
 Integrated. The planning process should address the interrelationships and interdependence of each component within the defined management area, including natural processes, activities, and authorities.
The IOC-UNESCO Marine Spatial Planning Programme helps countries implement ecosystem-based management by finding space for biodiversity, conservation and sustainable economic development in marine areas. IOC-UNESCO has developed several guides, including a 10-step guide on how to get a marine spatial plan started: "Step-by-step Approach for Marine Spatial Planning toward Ecosystem-based Management". IOC-UNESCO has also developed a world-wide inventory of MSP activities.

Marine spatial planning in the United Kingdom

The Marine and Coastal Access Act 2009 defined arrangements for a new system of marine management, including the introduction of marine spatial planning, across the UK. Although the new system comprises the principles of marine spatial planning as articulated by the European Commission, it is commonly referred to in the UK simply as 'marine planning'.

Among the government's stated aims for the new marine planning system is to ensure that coastal areas, the activities within them and the problems they face are managed in an integrated and holistic way. This will require close interaction with town and country planning regimes and, in England and Wales, the new regime for nationally significant infrastructure projects (NSIPs) in key sectors, such as energy and transport.

The Marine Policy Statement

The cornerstone of the UK marine planning system is the Marine Policy Statement (MPS). It sets out the sectoral/activity specific policy objectives that the UK Government, Scottish Government, Welsh Assembly Government and Northern Ireland Executive are seeking to achieve in the marine area in securing the UK vision of  'clean, healthy, safe, productive and biologically diverse oceans and seas.'

The MPS is the framework for preparing Marine Plans and taking decisions that affect the marine environment in England, Scotland, Wales and Northern Ireland. It will also set the direction for new marine licensing and other authorisation systems in each administration. It is proposed that the draft MPS, which was subject to consultation in 2010, will be formally adopted as Government policy in 2011.

The Marine Management Organisation

In England, the new arrangements provide for the creation of the Marine Management Organisation (MMO), which started work in April 2010. The MMO will deliver UK marine policy objectives for English waters through a series of statutory Marine Plans and other measures. The first Marine Plans will start to be prepared by the MMO on adoption of the MPS in 2011. The UK Government's Consultation on a marine planning system for England document provides, for the benefit of the MMO and other interested parties, more detail on the scope, structure, content and process envisaged for each Marine Plan.

Marine Scotland (Scottish Government) 
Marine Scotland is the government authority which will implement marine planning in Scottish waters under the Marine (Scotland) Act. A pre-consultation National Marine Plan was prepared in 2011 and the final Plan was released in March 2015

Marine spatial planning in the United States
On June 12, 2009, President Obama created an Interagency Ocean Policy Task Force to provide recommendations on ocean policy, including MSP.

Some individual states have already undertaken MSP initiatives:

Massachusetts
The Massachusetts Ocean Act, enacted in May 2008, requires the secretary of the Massachusetts Office of Energy and Environmental Affairs to develop a comprehensive ocean management plan. The plan will be submitted to NOAA for incorporation into the existing coastal zone management plan and enforced through the state’s regulatory and permitting processes, including the Massachusetts Environmental Policy Act (MEPA) and Chapter 91, the state’s waterways law.

The goal is to institute a comprehensive approach to ocean resource management that supports ecosystem health and economic vitality, balances current ocean uses, and considers future needs. This will be accomplished by determining where specific ocean uses will be permitted and which ocean uses are compatible.

Rhode Island

The Rhode Island Ocean Special Area Management Plan, or Ocean SAMP, serves as a federally recognized coastal management and regulatory tool. It was adopted by the Coastal Resource Management Council (CRMC),the state’s coastal management agency on October 19, 2010. The Ocean SAMP was then adopted by the National Oceanic and Atmospheric Administration (NOAA) on May 11, 2011. Using the best available science, the Ocean SAMP provides a balanced approach to the development and protection of Rhode Island's ocean-based resources.

Research projects undertaken by University of Rhode Island (URI) scientists provide the essential scientific basis for Ocean SAMP policy development.  The Ocean SAMP document underwent an extensive public review process prior to adoption.

California
In 1999, the California state legislature adopted the Marine Life Protection Act. This action required the state to evaluate and possibly redesign all existing state marine protected areas and to potentially create new protected areas that could, to the greatest degree possible, act as a networked system. (Marine protected area designations in California include state marine reserves, marine parks, and marine conservation areas.) This effort does not meet the full definition of marine spatial planning since its goal was to cite only protected areas, rather than all potential ocean uses, but many of its elements (such as stakeholder involvement and mapping approaches) will be of interest to marine spatial planners.

Oregon
Two controversial ocean issues led to a marine spatial planning effort: concern by fishermen over the designation of marine reserves off the Oregon coast, and proposals by industry to site wave energy facilities in Oregon ocean waters.

An executive order directed the Oregon Department of Land Conservation and Development to work with stakeholders and scientists to prepare a plan for ocean energy development (also known as wave energy). This plan was then to be adopted as part of the Oregon Territorial Sea Plan.

The state has appointed an advisory committee and expects to adopt the plan in early 2010. It will include mandatory policies for state and federal agency decisions with regard to locating ocean energy facilities in the Oregon Territorial Sea.

Washington
In March 2010, the Washington State Legislature enacted the Marine Waters Planning and Management Act to address resource use conflicts. A report to the legislature providing guidance and recommendations for moving forward was produced in 2011, and based on the 2012 report, the legislature authorized funds to begin the MSP process off of Washington’s coast.

A state law required an interagency team to provide recommendations to the Washington State Legislature about how to effectively use Marine Spatial Planning and integrate MSP into existing state management plans and authorities. The team is chaired by the Governor's office and coordinated by the Department of Ecology. Other members include the Washington Department of Natural Resources, Washington Sea Grant, the Washington Department of Fish and Wildlife, and Washington State Parks and Recreation Commission.

Evaluation of Spatially managed marine areas
To evaluate how well a marine spatial plan performs, the EU FP7 project MESMA (2009-2013) has developed a step-wise evaluation approach. This framework provides guidance on the selection, mapping, and assessment of ecosystem components and human pressures. It also addresses the evaluation of management effectiveness and potential adaptations to management. Moreover, it provides advice on the use of spatially explicit tools for practical tasks like the assessment of cumulative impacts of human pressures or pressure-state relationships. Governance is directly linked to the framework through a governance analysis that can be performed in parallel and feeds into the different steps of the framework. To help managers, MESMA has developed a tools portal.

Tools
There are a number of useful and innovative tools that can help managers implement marine spatial planning. Some include:
 USA MarineCadastre.gov 
   Australia's Marxan Software
   SeaSketch, a collaborative geodesign tool for MSP
   UCSB's Global Map of Human Impacts to Marine Ecosystems
 Duke University's Marine Geospatial Ecology Tools
 Center for Ocean Solutions'  Collaborative Geospatial Information and Tools
    MESMA Tools for monitoring and evaluation of marine spatial planning
 Scotland's National Marine Plan Interactive and Marine Scotland Information Portal
 Mid-Atlantic Ocean Data Portal
 New England's Northeast Ocean Data Portal

See also
Land use planning
Marine Park
Marine Protected Area
Zoning

References

Further reading
 ABPmer (2005), Marine Spatial Planning Pilot Literature Review Peterborough.
 Online:http://www.abpmer.net/mspp
 ABPmer (2006), Marine Spatial Planning Pilot Final Report. Peterborough.
 Online:http://www.abpmer.net/mspp
 Joint Marine Programme Marine Update 55 (2007): Marine Spatial Planning: A down to earth view of managing activities in the marine environment for the benefit of humans and wildlife
 Long R. (2007). Marine Resource Law. Dublin: Thompson Round Hall
 Gubbay S. (2004). Marine protected areas in the context of marine spatial planning—discussing the links. A report for WWF-UK Online: https://web.archive.org/web/20070106114002/http://www.wwf.org.uk/filelibrary/pdf/MPAs-marinespacialplanning.pdf

External links and references
 UNESCO International Ocean Council MSP Guide
 NOAA's MSP Information Site
 Marine Spatial Planning from Plymouth Marine Institute
 White House Memorandum creating Interagency Ocean Policy Task Force
 Washington's MSP Site
 MESMA Toolbox for monitoring and evaluation of marine spatial planning

Oceanography